The 1979 All-Ireland Minor Football Championship was the 48th staging of the All-Ireland Minor Football Championship, the Gaelic Athletic Association's premier inter-county Gaelic football tournament for boys under the age of 18.

Mayo entered the championship as defending champions, however, they were defeated by Dublin in the All-Ireland semi-final.

On 16 September 1979, Dublin won the championship following a 0-10 to 1-6 defeat of Kerry in the All-Ireland final. This was their eighth All-Ireland title and their first title in twenty championship seasons.

Results

Connacht Minor Football Championship

Quarter-Final

Semi-Finals

Final

Leinster Minor Football Championship

Preliminary Round

Quarter-Finals

Semi-Finals

Final

Munster Minor Football Championship

Quarter-Finals

Semi-Finals

Finals

Ulster Minor Football Championship

Preliminary Round

Quarter-Finals

Semi-Finals

Final

All-Ireland Minor Football Championship

Semi-Finals

Final

References

1979
All-Ireland Minor Football Championship